This is a list of high schools and school districts in the U.S. state of Missouri.

Adair County

Adair County R-I High School, Novinger
Adair County R-II High School, Brashear

Kirksville

Kirksville High School
Life Church School

Andrew County

North Andrew County High School, Rosendale
Savannah High School, Savannah

Atchison County

Fairfax High School, Fairfax
Rock Port High School, Rock Port
Tarkio High School, Tarkio

Audrain County

Community High School, Laddonia
Van-Far High School, Vandalia

Mexico

Mexico Senior High School
Missouri Military Academy - nondenominational Christian (all-male)

Barry County

Cassville High School, Cassville
Exeter High School, Exeter
Monett High School, Monett
Purdy High School, Purdy
Southwest High School, Washburn
Wheaton High School, Wheaton

Barton County

Golden City High School, Golden City
Lamar High School, Lamar
Liberal High School, Liberal

Bates County

Adrian High School, Adrian
Hume High School, Hume
Miami High School, Amoret
Rich Hill High School, Rich Hill

Butler

Ballard High School
Butler High School

Benton County

Cole Camp High School, Cole Camp
Lincoln High School, Lincoln
Warsaw High School, Warsaw

Bollinger County

Leopold High School, Leopold
Meadow Heights High School, Patton
Woodland High School, Marble Hill
Zalma High School, Zalma

Boone County

Hallsville High School, Hallsville
Harrisburg High School, Harrisburg
Southern Boone High School, Ashland
Sturgeon High School, Sturgeon

Centralia

Centralia High School
Sunnydale Adventist Academy - Seventh-Day Adventist (co-ed)

Columbia

Public schools

David H. Hickman High School
Frederick Douglass High School
Muriel Battle High School
Rock Bridge High School

Private schools

Christian Fellowship School - nondenominational Christian (co-ed)
Columbia Independent School - nonsectarian (co-ed)
Heritage Academy 
Tolton High School - Roman Catholic (co-ed)
University of Missouri High School - nonsectarian (co-ed)

Buchanan County

DeKalb High School, De Kalb
East Buchanan County High School, Gower
Mid-Buchanan County High School, Faucett

St. Joseph

Public schools

Benton High School
St. Joseph Central High School
Lafayette High School

Private schools

Baptist Temple Schools - Baptist (co-ed)
Bishop Le Blond High School - Roman Catholic (co-ed)
St. Joseph Christian School- nondenominational Christian (co-ed)
South Park Christian Academy - Pentecostal (co-ed)

Butler County

Neelyville High School, Neelyville
Twin Rivers High School, Broseley

Poplar Bluff

Agape Christian School - nondenominational Christian (co-ed)
Poplar Bluff High School
Southern Missouri Christian School - Pentecostal (co-ed)
Westwood Baptist Academy - Baptist (co-ed)
Zion Lutheran School - Missouri Synod Lutheran (co-ed)

Caldwell County

Braymer High School, Braymer
Breckenridge High School, Breckenridge
Penney High School, Hamilton
Polo High School, Polo

Callaway County

Fulton High School, Fulton
New Bloomfield High School, New Bloomfield
North Callaway High School, Kingdom City
South Callaway High School, Mokane

Camden County

Climax Springs High School, Climax Springs
Macks Creek High School, Macks Creek
Stoutland High School, Stoutland

Camdenton

Camden Christian School - Baptist (co-ed)
Camdenton High School

Cape Girardeau County

Delta High School, Delta
Oak Ridge High School, Oak Ridge

Cape Girardeau

Cape Central High School
Cape Girardeau Career & Technology Center
Eagle Ridge Christian School - nondenominational Christian (co-ed)
Notre Dame Regional High School - Roman Catholic (co-ed)

Jackson

Jackson High School
Saxony Lutheran High School - Missouri Synod Lutheran (co-ed)

Carroll County

Bosworth High School, Bosworth
Carrollton High School, Carrollton
Hale High School, Hale
Norborne High School, Norborne
Tina-Avalon High School, Tina

Carter County

East Carter County High School, Ellsinore
Van Buren High School, Van Buren

Cass County

Archie High School, Archie
Drexel High School, Drexel
Harrisonville High School, Harrisonville
Midway High School, Cleveland
Raymore–Peculiar High School/Freshman Center, Peculiar
Sherwood High School, Creighton
Training Center Christian School, Garden City - Pentecostal (co-ed)

Belton

Belton High School/Freshman Center
Heartland High School - Baptist (co-ed)

Pleasant Hill

Hope Baptist Christian School - Baptist (co-ed)
Pleasant Hill High School

Cedar County

El Dorado Springs

El Dorado Christian School - Church of God (co-ed)
El Dorado Springs High School

Stockton

Agape Baptist Academy - Baptist (all male)
Stockton High School

Chariton County

Brunswick High School, Brunswick
Keytesville High School, Keytesville
Northwestern High School, Mendon
Salisbury High School, Salisbury

Christian County

Billings High School, Billings
Chadwick High School, Chadwick
Clever High School, Clever
Nixa Public High School, Nixa
Ozark High School, Ozark
Sparta High School, Sparta

Spokane

Faith Christian School - Baptist (co-ed)
Spokane High School

Clark County
Clark County High School, Kahoka

Clay County

Excelsior Springs High School, Excelsior Springs
Kearney High School, Kearney
Outreach Christian Education School, Avondale - nondenominational Christian (co-ed)
Smithville High School, Smithville

Liberty

Liberty High School
Liberty North High School

Kansas City

Eagle Heights Christian School - Baptist (co-ed)
Faith Academy - non-denominational (co-ed)
North Kansas City High School
Northland Christian School - non-denominational (co-ed)
Oak Park High School
Staley High School
Winnetonka High School
St. Pius X High School - Roman Catholic (co-ed)

Clinton County

Cameron High School, Cameron
Lathrop High School, Lathrop
Plattsburg High School, Plattsburg

Cole County

Russellville High School, Russellville
Eugene High School, Eugene

Jefferson City

Blair Oaks High School
Calvary Lutheran High School - Lutheran (co-ed)
Central Baptist Christian Academy - Baptist (co-ed)
Helias Catholic High School - Roman Catholic (co-ed)
Jefferson City High School/Simonsen 9th Grade Center
Lighthouse Preparatory Academy - nonsectarian (co-ed)

Cooper County

Boonville High School, Booneville
Bunceton High School, Bunceton
Otterville High School, Otterville
Pilot Grove High School, Pilot Grove
Prairie Home High School, Prairie Home

Crawford County

Bourbon High School, Bourbon
Cuba High School, Cuba
Meramec Valley Christian School, Sullivan - Baptist (co-ed)
Steelville High School, Steelville

Dade County

Dadeville High School, Dadeville
Everton High School, Everton
Greenfield High School, Greenfield
Lockwood High School, Lockwood

Dallas County
Buffalo High School, Buffalo

Daviess County

Gallatin High School, Gallatin
North Daviess High School, Jameson
Pattonsburg High School, Pattonsburg
Tri-County High School, Jamesport
Winston High School, Winston

DeKalb County

Maysville High School, Maysville
Osborn High School, Osborn
Stewartsville High School, Stewartsville
Union Star High School, Union Star

Dent County
Salem High School, Salem

Douglas County

Ava

Ava High School
Mt. Zion Bible Academy - Church of God (co-ed)

Dunklin County

Campbell High School, Campbell
Clarkton High School, Clarkton
Holcomb High School, Holcomb
Malden High School, Malden
Senath-Hornersville High School, Senath
Southland High School, Cardwell

Kennett

Kennett Christian Academy - Pentecostal (co-ed)
Kennett High School

Franklin County

Crosspoint Christian School, Villa Ridge - nondenominational Christian (co-ed)
The Fulton School at St. Albans, St. Albans - nonsectarian Montessori (co-ed)
Pacific High School, Pacific
New Haven High School, New Haven
Sullivan High School, Sullivan
Union High School, Union

St. Clair

Cornerstone Baptist Academy - other affiliation (co-ed)
St. Clair High School

Washington

Four Rivers Career Center
St. Francis Borgia Regional High School - Roman Catholic (co-ed)
Washington High School

Gasconade County

Hermann High School, Hermann
Owensville High School, Owensville

Gentry County

Albany High School, Albany
King City High School, King City
Stanberry High School, Stanberry

Greene County

Ash Grove High School, Ash Grove
Fair Grove High School, Fair Grove
Logan-Rogersville High School, Rogersville
Republic High School, Republic
Strafford High School, Strafford
Walnut Grove High School, Walnut Grove
Willard High School, Willard

Springfield

Public schools

Bailey Educational Center
Community Learning Center
Glendale High School
Graff Career Center
Hillcrest High School
Kickapoo High School
Parkview High School
Phelps Gifted Center
Springfield Central High School

Private schools

Christian Schools of Springfield - Baptist (co-ed)
Grace Classical Academy - nondenominational Christian (co-ed)
Greenwood Laboratory School - nonsectarian (co-ed)
New Covenant Academy - nondenominational Christian (co-ed)
Springfield Catholic High School - Roman Catholic (co-ed)
Summit Preparatory School of Southwest Missouri - nonsectarian (co-ed)

Grundy County

Grundy County High School, Galt
Trenton High School, Trenton

Harrison County

Cainsville High School, Cainsville
Gilman City High School, Gilman City
North Harrison County High School, Eagleville
Ridgeway High School, Ridgeway
South Harrison County High School, Bethany

Henry County

Calhoun High School, Calhoun
Clinton High School, Clinton
Windsor High School, Windsor
Montrose High School, Montrose

Hickory County

Hermitage High School, Hermitage
Skyline High School, Urbana
Weaubleau High School, Weaubleau
Wheatland High School, Wheatland

Holt County

Craig High School, Craig
Mound City High School, Mound City
South Holt County High School, Oregon

Howard County

Fayette High School, Fayette
Glasgow High School, Glasgow
New Franklin High School, New Franklin

Howell County
Willow Springs High School, Willow Springs

Mountain View

Liberty High School
South Central Career Center
Trinity Christian Academy - Pentecostal (co-ed)

West Plains

Faith Assembly Christian School - Pentecostal (co-ed)
West Plains High School

Iron County

Arcadia Valley High School, Ironton
Viburnum High School, Viburnum
South Iron County High School, Annapolis

Jackson County

Grain Valley High School, Grain Valley
Lone Jack High School, Lone Jack
Oak Grove High School, Oak Grove

Blue Springs

Blue Springs High School
Blue Springs South High School
Valley View High School
Plaza Heights Christian Academy - nondenominational Christian (co-ed)

Grandview

Grandview Christian School - non-denominational Christian (co-ed)
Grandview High School

Independence

Center Place Restoration School - Community of Christ (Restoration, co-ed)
Fort Osage High School
Independence Academy
McCune School for Boys
Truman High School
Van Horn High School
William Chrisman High School

Kansas City

Public schools

Center High School
Central High School
East High School
Manual Career & Technical Center
Northeast High School
Ruskin High School
Southeast High School

Charter/magnet schools

Alta Vista Charter School
Hogan Preparatory Academy
Lee A. Tolbert Community Academy
Lincoln College Preparatory Academy
Paseo Academy of Performing Arts
University Academy

Private schools

Archbishop O'Hara High School - Roman Catholic (co-ed)
The Barstow School - nonsectarian (co-ed)
Blue Ridge Christian School - non-denominational Christian (co-ed)
Cristo Rey Kansas City High School - Roman Catholic (co-ed)
De la Salle Education Center - nonsectarian (co-ed)
Gillis Center School - nonsectarian (co-ed)
Heart of America Christian Academy - Pentecostal (co-ed)
Kansas City Academy - nonsectarian (co-ed)
Lutheran High School of Kansas City - Lutheran (co-ed)
Notre Dame de Sion School - Roman Catholic (co-ed)
The Pembroke Hill School - nonsectarian (co-ed)
Rockhurst High School - Roman Catholic (all boys)
St. Paul's Episcopal Day School - Episcopalian (co-ed)
St. Teresa's Academy - Roman Catholic (all girls)
Seton Center High School - nonsectarian (co-ed)
Universal Academy Islamic School - Muslim - (co-ed)
Whitefield Academy - nondenominational Christian (co-ed)

Lee's Summit

Lee's Summit High School
Lee's Summit North High School
Lee's Summit West High School
St. Michael the Archangel Catholic High School - Roman Catholic (co-ed)
Summit Christian Academy - nondenominational Christian (co-ed)

Raytown

Raytown High School
Raytown South High School

Jasper County

Carl Junction High School, Carl Junction
Carthage Senior High School, Carthage
Jasper High School, Jasper
Sarcoxie High School, Sarcoxie
Webb City High School, Webb City

Joplin

College Heights Christian School - nondenominational Christian (co-ed)
Joplin High School
McAuley Catholic High School - Roman Catholic (co-ed)
Thomas Jefferson Independent Day School - nonsectarian (co-ed)

Jefferson County

Crystal City High School, Crystal City
Herculaneum High School, Herculaneum
Grandview High School, Ware
Northwest High School, Cedar Hill

Arnold

Fox High School
People's Christian Academy - Pentecostal (co-ed)

De Soto

De Soto High School
Manna Christian Academy - Southern Baptist (co-ed)

Festuts

Festus High School
Jefferson County High School
St. Pius X High School - Roman Catholic (co-ed)
Twin City Christian Academy - Baptist (co-ed)

Hillsboro

Christian Outreach School - nondenominational Christian (co-ed)
Hillsboro High School

Imperial

Seckman High School
Windsor High School

Johnson County

Chilhowee High School, Chilhowee
Holden High School, Holden
Crest Ridge High School, Centerview
Kingsville High School, Kingsville
Knob Noster High School, Knob Noster
Leeton High School, Leeton
Warrensburg High School, Warrensburg

Knox County
Knox County High School, Edina

Laclede County

Conway High School, Conway
Lebanon High School, Lebanon

Lafayette County

Lafayette County High School, Higginsville
Lexington High School, Lexington
Odessa High School, Odessa
Santa Fe High School, Alma
Wellington-Napoleon High School, Wellington

Concordia

Concordia High School
St. Paul Lutheran High School - Lutheran (co-ed)

Lawrence County

Marionville High School, Marionville
Miller High School, Miller
Mount Vernon High School, Mount Vernon
Pierce City High School, Pierce City
Verona High School, Verona

Aurora

Aurora Christian Academy - Baptist (co-ed)
Aurora High School
Harvest Christian Academy - nondenominational Christian (co-ed)

Lewis County
Highland High School, Ewing

Canton

Canton High School
Cedar Falls School - nondenominational Christian (co-ed)

Lincoln County

Elsberry High School, Elsberry
Silex High School, Silex

Troy

Troy Holiness School - Methodist (co-ed)
Troy Buchanan High School/Freshman Center

Winfield

Calvary Christian School - Pentecostal (co-ed)
Winfield High School

Linn County

Brookfield High School, Brookfield
Bucklin High School, Bucklin
Linn County High School, Purdin
Marceline High School, Marceline
Meadville High School, Meadville

Livingston County

Chillicothe High School, Chillicothe
Southwest Livingston County High School, Ludlow

Macon County

Atlanta High School, Atlanta
Bevier High School, Bevier
La Plata High School, La Plata
Macon High School, Macon
Macon County High School, New Cambria

Madison County
Marquand-Zion High School, Marquand

Fredericktown

Faith Christian Academy - Baptist (co-ed)
Fredericktown High School

Maries County

Vienna High School, Vienna
Belle High School, Belle

Marion County

Hannibal High School, Hannibal
Marion County High School, Philadelphia
Palmyra High School, Palmyra

McDonald County
McDonald County High School, Anderson

Mercer County

Mercer High School, Mercer
Princeton High School, Princeton

Miller County

Eldon High School, Eldon
Tuscumbia High School, Tuscumbia
St. Elizabeth High School, St. Elizabeth
Osage High School, Osage Beach

Iberia

Iberia High School
Powerhouse Christian Academy - nondenominational Christian (co-ed)

Mississippi County

Charleston High School, Charleston
East Prairie High School, East Prairie

Moniteau County

Jamestown High School, Jamestown
California High School, California
Tipton High School, Tipton

Morgan County

Morgan County R-I High School, Stover
Morgan County R-II High School, Versailles

Monroe County

Madison High School, Madison
Monroe City High School, Monroe City

Paris

Foundation for Life Christian School - nondenominational Christian (co-ed)
Paris High School

Montgomery County

Montgomery County High School, Montgomery City
Wellsville-Middletown High School, Wellsville

New Madrid County

Gideon High School, Gideon
New Madrid County Central High School, New Madrid
Portageville High School, Portageville
Risco High School, Risco

Newton County

Diamond High School, Diamond
East Newton County High School, Granby
Racine Apostolic Christian School, Racine - Pentecostal (co-ed)
Seneca High School, Seneca

Neosho

Neosho Christian Schools - Church of Christ (co-ed)
Neosho High School
Ozark Christian Academy - Pentecostal (co-ed)
Trinity Learning Center - Protestant (co-ed)

Nodaway County

Jefferson High School, Conception Junction
Nodaway-Holt High School, Graham
North Nodaway High School, Hopkins
Northeast Nodaway High School, Ravenwood
South Nodaway High School, Barnard
West Nodaway High School, Burlington Junction

Maryville

Maryville High School
Missouri Academy of Science, Mathematics and Computing

Oregon County

Alton High School, Alton
Couch High School, Myrtle
Koshkonong High School, Koshkonong
Thayer High School, Thayer

Osage County

Chamois High School, Chamois
Linn High School, Linn
Fatima High School, Westphalia

Ozark County

Bakersfield High School, Bakersfield
Dora High School, Dora
Gainesville High School, Gainesville
Lutie High School, Theodosia

Pemiscot County

Caruthersville High School, Caruthersville
Cooter High School, Cooter
Delta High School, Deering
Hayti High School, Hayti
North Pemiscot County High School, Wardell
South Pemiscot County High School, Steele

Perry County

Perryville

Perryville High School
St. Vincent de Paul Schools - Roman Catholic (co-ed)

Pettis County

Green Ridge High School, Green Ridge
Northwest High School, Hughesville
Smithton High School, Smithton

La Monte

La Monte High School
Show-Me Christian School - nondenominational Christian (co-ed)

Sedalia

Applewood Christian School - nondenominational Christian (co-ed)
Sacred Heart School - Roman Catholic (co-ed)
Smith-Cotton High School

Phelps County

Newburg High School, Newburg
Rolla High School, Rolla

St. James

Boys & Girls Town of Missouri School - nonsectarian (co-ed)
St. James High School

Pike County

Bowling Green High School, Bowling Green
Clopton High School, Clarksville
Louisiana High School, Louisiana
Pike County Christian School, Curryville - Baptist

Platte County

North Platte County High School, Dearborn
Platte County High School, Platte City
West Platte County High School, Weston

Kansas City

Park Hill High School
Park Hill South High School

Polk County

Bolivar High School, Bolivar
Fair Play High School, Fair Play
Halfway High School, Halfway
Humansville High School, Humansville
Marion C. Early High School, Morrisville
Pleasant Hope High School, Pleasant Hope
Word of God Fellowship Academy, Bolivar - nondenominational Christian (co-ed)

Pulaski County

Crocker High School, Crocker
Dixon High School, Dixon
Laquey High School, Laquey
Maranatha Baptist Academy, St. Robert - Baptist (co-ed)
Richland High School, Richland
Waynesville High School, Waynesville

Putnam County
Putnam County High School, Unionville

Ralls County
Mark Twain High School, Center

Randolph County

Higbee High School, Higbee
Moberly High School, Moberly
Northeast Randolph County High School, Cairo
Westran High School, Huntsville

Ray County

Hardin-Central High School, Hardin
Lawson High School, Lawson
Orrick High School, Orrick
Richmond High School, Richmond

Reynolds County

Bunker High School, Bunker
Lesterville High School, Lesterville
Southern Reynolds County High School, Ellington

Ripley County
Naylor High School, Naylor

Doniphan

Current River Area Vocational School
Doniphan High School
West Point Christian Academy - Pentecostal (co-ed)

St. Charles County

Francis Howell Central High School - Cottleville
Francis Howell High School - Weldon Spring Heights
Liberty High School, Lake St. Louis

O'Fallon

Christian High School
Fort Zumwalt Hope High School
Fort Zumwalt North High School 
Fort Zumwalt West High School
Liberty Classical School - nondenominational Christian (co-ed)
Living Word Christian Schools - nondenominational Christian (co-ed)
St. Dominic High School - Roman Catholic (co-ed)

St. Charles

Duchesne High School - Roman Catholic (co-ed)
Francis Howell Union High School
Lewis & Clark Career Center
Orchard Farm High School
St. Charles High School
St. Charles West High School
Success Campus

St. Peters

Fort Zumwalt East High School
Fort Zumwalt South High School
Francis Howell North High School 
Lutheran High School of St. Charles County - Lutheran (co-ed)

Wentzville

Emil E. Holt High School
Timberland High School

St. Clair County

Appleton City High School, Appleton City
Osceola High School, Osceola

St. Francois County

Bismarck High School, Bismarck
North St. Francois County High School, Bonne Terre

Farmington

Farmington High School
St. Paul Lutheran School - Missouri Synod Lutheran (co-ed)

Park Hills

Park Hills Central High School
West St. Francois County High School

St. Louis City

Public schools 

Beaumont Technical Center
Carnahan High School of the Future
Central Visual and Performing Arts High School
Clyde C. Miller Career Academy
Collegiate School of Medicine and Bioscience
Fresh Start Academy at Sumner
Gateway STEM High School
Griscom Alternative School
Innovative Concept Academy at Blewett
McKinley Classical Leadership Academy
Metro Academic and Classical High School
Nottingham Community Access and Job Training School
Roosevelt High School 
Soldan International Studies High School
Sumner High School
Vashon High School

Private Schools 

Bishop DuBourg High School - Catholic (co-ed)
Cardinal Ritter College Prep High School - Catholic (co-ed)
Crossroads College Preparatory School - non-sectarian (co-ed)
Rosati-Kain High School - Catholic (all-female)
St. Louis University High School - Catholic (all-male)
St. Mary's High School - Catholic (all-male)

St. Louis County

Bayless Senior High School, Unincorporated St. Louis County
Brentwood High School, Brentwood
Clayton High School, Clayton
Eureka High School, Eureka
Hazelwood West High School, Hazelwood
Incarnate Word Academy, Bel-Nor
Jennings High School, Jennings
Lafayette High School, Wildwood
Maplewood Richmond Heights High School, Maplewood
McCluer South-Berkeley High School, Ferguson
Mehlville High School, Mehlville
Oakville High School, St. Louis
Parkway South High School, Manchester
Pattonville High School, Maryland Heights
Ritenour High School, St. Ann
Riverview Gardens High School, Riverview
St. Joseph's Academy, Frontenac
University City High School, University City
Ursuline Academy, Oakland
Valley Park High School, Valley Park

Affton

Affton High School
Cor Jesu Academy
Lutheran High School South

Ballwin

Al Manara Academy
Parkway West High School

Chesterfield

Marquette High School
Parkway Central High School

Creve Coeur

Fern Ridge High School
Parkway North High School
Chaminade College Preparatory School
De Smet Jesuit High School 
St. Louis Priory School
Whitfield School

Des Peres

Villa Duchesne
Visitation Academy of St. Louis

Fenton

Heritage Classical Christian Academy
Rockwood Summit High School

Florissant

Hazelwood Central High School
McCluer High School
McCluer North High School
North County Christian School
North Technical High School

Kirkwood

Kirkwood High School
St. John Vianney High School

Ladue

Ladue Horton Watkins High School
John Burroughs School 
Mary Institute and St. Louis Country Day School
Westminster Christian Academy

Lemay

Hancock High School
Notre Dame High School

Normandy

Normandy High School
Lutheran High School North

Spanish Lake

Hazelwood East High School
Trinity Catholic High School

Sunset Hills

Lindbergh High School
South Technical High School
Thomas Jefferson School

Town and Country

Christian Brothers College High School
Neuwoehner High School
The Principia School

Webster Groves

Christian Brothers College High School
Nerinx Hall High School 
Webster Groves High School

Ste. Genevieve County

Ste. Genevieve County

Ste. Genevieve High School
Valle Catholic Schools - Roman Catholic (co-ed)

Saline County

Malta Bend High School, Malta Bend
Slater High School, Slater
Sweet Springs High School, Sweet Springs

Marshall

Calvary Baptist School - Baptist (co-ed)
Marshall High School

Schuyler County
Schuyler County High School, Queen City

Scotland County
Scotland County High School, Memphis

Scott County

Chaffee High School, Chaffee
Oran High School, Oran
Scott City High School, Scott City
Thomas W. Kelly High School, Benton

Sikeston

Scott County Central High School
Sikeston High School

Shannon County

Eminence High School, Eminence
Winona High School, Winona

Shelby County

Heartland Christian Academy, Bethel - Pentecostal (co-ed)
North Shelby High School, Shelbyville

Shelbina

South Shelby High School
Shiloh Christian School - nondenominational Christian (co-ed)

Stoddard County

Advance High School, Advance
Bell City High School, Bell City
Bernie High School, Bernie
Bloomfield High School, Bloomfield
Dexter High School, Dexter
Puxico High School, Puxico
Richland High School, Essex

Stone County

Blue Eye High School, Blue Eye
Crane High School, Crane
Galena High School, Galena
Hurley High School, Hurley

Reeds Spring

Gibson Technical Center
New Horizons Alternative School
Reeds Spring High School

Sullivan County

Green City High School, Green City
Milan High School, Milan
Newtown-Harris High School, Newtown

Taney County

Bradleyville High School, Bradleyville
Branson High School, Branson
Forsyth High School, Forsyth

Hollister

Hollister High School
Trinity Christian Academy - nondenominational Christian (co-ed)

Texas County

Cabool High School, Cabool
Houston High School, Houston
Licking High School, Licking
Plato High School, Plato
Summersville High School, Summersville

Vernon County

Bronaugh High School, Bronaugh
Nevada High School, Nevada
Northeast Vernon County High School, Walker
Sheldon High School, Sheldon

Warren County

Warrenton High School, Warrenton
Wright City High School, Wright City

Washington County

Kingston High School, Cadet
Potosi High School, Potosi
Valley High School, Caledonia

Wayne County

Greenville High School, Greenville
New Hope Christian Academy, Silva - Baptist (co-ed)

Piedmont

Clearwater High School
Victory Baptist Academy - Baptist (co-ed)

Webster County

Fordland High School, Fordland
Niangua High School, Niangua
Seymour High School, Seymour

Marshfield

Marshfield Christian School - nondenominational Christian (co-ed)
Marshfield High School

Worth County
Worth County High School, Grant City

Wright County

Hartville High School, Hartville
Mansfield High School, Mansfield

Mountain Grove

Mountain Grove Christian Academy- nondenominational Christian (co-ed)
Mountain Grove High School
Ozark Mountain Technical Center

Norwood

Liberty Faith Christian Academy - nondenominational Christian (co-ed)
Norwood High School

See also 
List of school districts in Missouri

External links 
List of high schools in Missouri from SchoolTree.org

References

 
Missouri
High